Grebbeberg War Cemetery is a Second World War military war grave cemetery, located on the Grebbeberg, a hill  east of Rhenen the Netherlands. The cemetery contains 799 military personnel and one civilian who died during the invasion of the Netherlands by the Germans in May 1940. More than 400 of those interred in the cemetery fell during the Battle of the Grebbeberg.

History
Immediately after the surrender of the Netherlands, a cemetery was laid out at the Grebbeberg for both Dutch and German dead. On 20 May 1940, the cemetery was completed and all the dead were buried. On 27 May all field graves were cleared from around Grebbeberg and the remains were reburied within the cemetery. 

The cemetery contained 380 Dutch graves and about 150 German graves. The graves were marked with wooden signs with the name of the soldier, if known. In 1942, a stone wall was built around the cemetery and all tombstones were replaced with headstones. Until that time, many family members or relatives had their own headstone placed on the grave. After the German surrender andfollowing the end of the war, all German graves were moved to the Ysselsteyn German war cemetery.

The reconstruction of the history of the National Army Monument Grebbeberg shows how the designer, architect J.J.P. Oud, in 1948–1953 conducted intensive consultations with the client about the meaning and symbolism of the monument.

Since the 1960s, many soldiers were moved from local graves to the cemetery.

Special significance
The cemetery has a special significance because it is located exactly at the point in the Netherlands where the fiercest fighting took place during the Second World War. After the surrender, it became the first official Dutch war cemetery. After the fighting (and the Dutch capitulation) the German occupiers ordered a search for victims from both sides to have them properly buried.

Commemoration
Since 1946, this cemetery serves as a national memorial site. Here the military memorial ceremony held on Remembrance of the Dead, 4 May. In addition, on Whit, a commemoration of the former Eighth Regiment Infantry takes place, where all the colleagues who died during the May days are commemorated.

Notable burials 
 Willem Pieter Landzaat, commander 1st battalion 8th Regiment Infantry (I-8 R.I.)

References

External links 
 
  Militair Ereveld Grebbeberg
 Military War Cemetery Grebbeberg

World War II cemeteries in the Netherlands
Cemeteries in the Netherlands
Cemeteries in Utrecht (province)
Rhenen